The 2021–22 Montreal Canadiens season was the 113th for the club that was established on December 4, 1909, and their 105th season as a franchise in the National Hockey League. 

The Canadiens were unable to replicate their success from the prior season that saw them reach the Stanley Cup Final, whereas on March 25, 2022, they became the first team to be eliminated from playoff contention following the Washington Capitals' 4-3 shootout victory over the Buffalo Sabres.

Ultimately, the Canadiens finished last in the league for the first time since the 1939–40 NHL season and the first time in the NHL's expansion era, in what was one of the worst seasons in the team's history. Collectively, they set team records for most regulation losses (49), most goals against (319), fewest wins (22), and fewest points (55), while its .335 point percentage was the team's third-worst ever, after only both the 1925–26 (.319) and 1939–40 (.260) campaigns. As a result of this, Montreal won the  draft lottery to select first overall in the NHL Entry Draft for the first time in 42 years. The Canadiens became the second team in history to finish with the NHL's worst record the year after reaching the Stanley Cup Final after the 2002-03 Carolina Hurricanes.

Standings

Divisional standings

Conference standings

Schedule and results

Regular season
The regular season schedule was released on July 22, 2021.

Player statistics

Final stats

Skaters

Goaltenders

†Denotes player spent time with another team before joining the Canadiens. Stats reflect time with the Canadiens only.
‡Denotes player was traded mid-season. Stats reflect time with the Canadiens only.
Bold/italics denotes franchise record.

Awards and honours

Milestones

Transactions
The Canadiens have been involved in the following transactions during the 2021–22 season.

Trades

Notes:
The Arizona Coyotes will receive the better of Montreal's own 1st-round pick in the 2022 NHL Entry Draft and Carolina's 1st-round pick in the 2022 NHL Entry Draft (previously acquired by Montreal). However, in the event that either or both of Montreal's own 1st-round pick and/or Carolina's 1st-round pick are Top 10 picks in the 2022 NHL Entry Draft (after the final Draft order has been established in accordance with the results of the 2022 NHL Draft Lottery), then Arizona will receive the worse of Montreal's own pick and Carolina's pick.
If the Calgary Flames' 1st-round pick in 2022 is a Top 10 pick, Montreal will instead receive their 2023 1st-round pick along with a 2024 4th-round pick.
Montreal will retain 50% of Chiarot's salary for the remainder of the 2021-22 season.
Montreal will retain 50% of Kulak's salary for the remainder of the 2021-22 season.
 If the Edmonton Oilers reach the 2022 Stanley Cup Final, the pick will instead become a 2nd-round selection in 2023.
Montreal will retain 50% of Lehkonen's salary for the remainder of the 2021-22 season.

Players acquired

Players lost

Notes:
As compensation for not matching the Offer Sheet made by the Carolina Hurricanes to restricted free agent Jesperi Kotkaniemi, Montreal receives a 1st-round and a 3rd-round pick in the 2022 NHL Entry Draft from Carolina.
Blandisi originally signed a Professional Tryout contract with the Toronto Marlies on December 14, 2021 prior to inking an AHL contract thereafter.

Signings

Draft picks

Below are the Montreal Canadiens' selections at the 2021 NHL Entry Draft, which was held on July 23 to 24, 2021. It was held virtually via Video conference call from the NHL Network studio in Secaucus, New Jersey.

References

Montreal Canadiens
Canadiens
Montreal Canadiens seasons
2020s in Montreal
2021 in Quebec